A shipping ton, freight ton, measurement ton or ocean ton is a measure of volume used for shipments of freight in large vehicles, trains or ships. It should not be confused with other types of ton which also measure volume.

See also
 Twenty-foot equivalent unit

References

Units of volume